or  (1740 – 19 November 1796) was an Icelandic lawyer who practised law in Copenhagen from 1763 to 1769. From 1769 to 1772, he was Lawman (prime minister) of the Faroe Islands.

After that, he moved to Norway. From 1772 to 1778 he was county governor of Finnmark county. In 1778–1780, he became county governor of Bornholm County in Denmark. From 1780 to 1786, we was a judge in Christianssand. In 1786, he became a county governor of Trondhjem county. He held that post until 1796 when he died in Trondhjem.

References

Thorkild Fjeldsted
County governors of Norway
Prime Ministers of the Faroe Islands
1740 births
1796 deaths